James Angulo Zamora (born January 20, 1974) is a former Colombian football player.

Club statistics

External links

odn.ne.jp

1974 births
Living people
Colombian footballers
Colombia under-20 international footballers
Colombian expatriate footballers
Categoría Primera A players
Peruvian Primera División players
J2 League players
América de Cali footballers
Independiente Santa Fe footballers
Deportes Quindío footballers
Shonan Bellmare players
Club Alianza Lima footballers
Juan Aurich footballers
Sport Boys footballers
Expatriate footballers in Peru
Expatriate footballers in Japan
Expatriate footballers in Ecuador
Association football forwards